Petelinje is a small settlement near Dolsko in the Municipality of Dol pri Ljubljani in the Upper Carniola region of Slovenia.

References

External links

Petelinje on Geopedia

Populated places in the Municipality of Dol pri Ljubljani